Public artworks in Tokyo, Japan, include:

 Flame of Freedom
 Ghibli Clock
 Godzilla head
 Growing Gardener
 Maman
 Statue of Hachikō
 Statue of Inoue Masaru
 Statue of Kanō Jigorō, Bunkyō
 Statue of Kanō Jigorō, Shinjuku
 Statue of Pierre de Coubertin
 Statue of Shinran
 Statue of Umashimadenomikoto
 Statue of Unicorn Gundam
 Statue of Yasuhito, Prince Chichibu
 Tokyo Brushstroke I and II

Tokyo
Public art